Hans Lüthi (born 15 March 1939) is a former Swiss cyclist. He competed in the individual road race and team time trial events at the 1964 Summer Olympics.

References

External links
 

1939 births
Living people
Swiss male cyclists
Olympic cyclists of Switzerland
Cyclists at the 1964 Summer Olympics
Cyclists from Zürich